Leandro Jones Johan Bacuna (born 21 August 1991) is a professional footballer who plays as a midfielder or right-back for Watford. Bacuna was capped 20 times at youth levels for the Netherlands and also represented the Netherlands Antilles at youth level. Bacuna represents the Curaçao national team, the successor side to the Netherlands Antilles, and won the Caribbean Cup with the side in 2017.

Club career

Groningen
On 30 October 2009, Bacuna made his first team debut for Groningen in an Eredivisie match against PSV. Bacuna has also played for Groningen's youth teams. On 6 November 2009, he scored his first goal for the first team in a league match against Heracles Almelo, an eventual 4–1 victory for Groningen.

Aston Villa
It was announced on 13 June 2013 that Bacuna had signed a three-year contract with Premier League club Aston Villa. Handed the number 7 shirt, Bacuna impressed many with his debut season for the Villains, despite constantly playing out of position at right back. Bacuna scored his first Premier League goal on 28 September at home to Manchester City. His second goal came from a free-kick in the claret and blues' 2–0 victory over Cardiff City. He continued his goalscoring run with goals against West Bromwich Albion, Everton and Norwich. 

In the 2014–15 season, however, Bacuna found it harder to break into the starting line-up, starting just one game in the Premier League. On 15 February 2015, he scored the first of two Villa goals in the fifth round of the FA Cup in a 2–1 win over Leicester City, taking the club into the quarter-finals.

On 20 August 2015, Bacuna signed a new long-term contract with the club.

Reading
On 13 August 2017, Bacuna moved to Reading, signing a four-year contract. He scored his first goal for Reading in an EFL Cup tie against Millwall on 22 August 2017.

Cardiff City
On 31 January 2019, Bacuna moved to Championship side Cardiff City, signing a four-and-a-half year deal for a transfer fee believed to be around £3 million. On June 10, 2022, Cardiff announced Bacuna would leave the club when his contract expired on June 30.

Watford
On 14 December 2022, Bacuna signed for Championship club Watford on a contract until the end of the 2022–23 season.

International career
Born in the Netherlands to parents of Afro-Curaçaoan descent, Bacuna played for the Netherlands Antilles under-20 side, as well as various youth Dutch teams. He received his first Curaçao national team call-up in March 2016, earning his first cap in a 1–0 loss to Barbados.

Personal life
He is the older brother of Birmingham City player Juninho Bacuna.

Career statistics

Club

International

As of match played 6 June 2022. Curaçao score listed first, score column indicates score after each Bacuna goal.

Honours

Club
Aston Villa
FA Cup runner-up: 2014–15

International
Curaçao
Caribbean Cup: 2017
King's Cup: 2019

References

External links

1991 births
Living people
Footballers from Groningen (city)
Curaçao footballers
Curaçao international footballers
Dutch footballers
Dutch expatriate footballers
Dutch people of Curaçao descent
Netherlands youth international footballers
Netherlands under-21 international footballers
Association football midfielders
FC Groningen players
Aston Villa F.C. players
Reading F.C. players
Cardiff City F.C. players
Watford F.C. players
Eredivisie players
Premier League players
English Football League players
Expatriate footballers in England
Expatriate footballers in Wales
Dutch expatriate sportspeople in England
2017 CONCACAF Gold Cup players
2019 CONCACAF Gold Cup players
FA Cup Final players